The 1931 UCI Road World Championships took place in Copenhagen, Denmark. Unusually, the race was not run as a traditional road race, but rather as an individual time-trial.

Events Summary

References

 
UCI Road World Championships by year
W
R
International cycle races hosted by Denmark